BBC Music Magazine is a British monthly magazine that focuses primarily on classical music.

History
The first issue appeared in September 1992. BBC Worldwide, the commercial subsidiary of the BBC, was the original owner and publisher together with the Warner Music Enterprises during its initial phase. Immediate Media Company has been the publisher since 2012.

BBC Music Magazine has also an edition in North America which was first published in March 1993. The magazine reflects the broadcast output of BBC Radio 3 being  devoted primarily to classical music, though with sections on jazz and world music. Each edition comes together with an audio CD, often including BBC recordings of full-length works. The magazine's circulation is 37,530. Profits "are returned to the BBC".  The magazine features articles on subjects such as favourite conductors and trends in 21st-century classical music. 

Previous editors of BBC Music Magazine have included Helen Wallace and Oliver Condy.  The current editor is Charlotte Smith, since January 2022.

References

External links
 Official BBC Music Magazine website
 List of cover discs

BBC music
BBC publications
Monthly magazines published in the United Kingdom
Music magazines published in the United Kingdom
Classical music magazines
Magazines established in 1992